Jiamusi Dongjiao Airport  is an international airport serving Jiamusi in Heilongjiang province, China. The airport is located 10 kilometers east of the city center.

History 
The initial construction of the airport started in 1932. In 1998, the renovation and expansion of the airport started and the airport was re-opened to the public in January 2000.

Facilities
Jiamusi Dongjiao Airport covers 260 hectares of land and has one runway.
 6/24: 2200 by 40 meters, Concrete.

Airlines and destinations

See also
List of airports in China
List of the busiest airports in China

References

Airports in Heilongjiang
Airports established in 2000